Compatibilism is the belief that free will and determinism are mutually compatible and that it is possible to believe in both without being logically inconsistent.

Compatibilists believe that freedom can be present or absent in situations for reasons that have nothing to do with metaphysics. They say that causal determinism does not exclude the truth of possible future outcomes.

Similarly, political liberty is a non-metaphysical concept. Statements of political liberty, such as the United States Bill of Rights, assume moral liberty: the ability to choose to do otherwise than what one does.

History 
Compatibilism was mentioned and championed by the ancient Stoics and some medieval scholastics. More specifically, scholastics like Thomas Aquinas and later Thomists (such as Domingo Báñez) are often interpreted as holding that human action can be free, even though an agent in some strong sense could not do otherwise than what they did. Whereas Aquinas is often interpreted to maintain rational compatibilism (i.e., an action can be determined by rational cognition and yet free), later Thomists, such as Báñez, develop a sophisticated theory of theological determinism, according to which actions of free agents, despite being free, are, on a higher level, determined by infallible divine decrees manifested in the form of "physical premotion", a deterministic intervention of God into the will of a free agent required to reduce the will from potency to act. A strong incompatibilist view of freedom was, on the other hand, developed in the Franciscan tradition, especially by Duns Scotus, and later upheld and further developed by Jesuits, especially Luis de Molina and Francisco Suárez. In the early modern era, compatibilism was maintained by Enlightenment philosophers (such as David Hume and Thomas Hobbes).

During the 20th century, compatibilists presented novel arguments that differed from the classical arguments of Hume, Hobbes, and John Stuart Mill. Importantly, Harry Frankfurt popularized what are now known as Frankfurt counterexamples to argue against incompatibilism, and developed a positive account of compatibilist free will based on higher-order volitions. Other "new compatibilists" include Gary Watson, Susan R. Wolf, P. F. Strawson, and R. Jay Wallace. Contemporary compatibilists range from the philosopher and cognitive scientist Daniel Dennett, particularly in his works Elbow Room (1984) and Freedom Evolves (2003), to the existentialist philosopher Frithjof Bergmann. Perhaps the most renowned contemporary defender of compatibilism is John Martin Fischer.

A 2020 survey found that 59% of philosophers accept compatibilism.

Defining free will 

Compatibilists often define an instance of "free will" as one in which the agent had the freedom to act according to their own motivation. That is, the agent was not coerced or restrained. Arthur Schopenhauer famously said: "Man can do what he wills but he cannot will what he wills." In other words, although an agent may often be free to act according to a motive, the nature of that motive is determined. This definition of free will does not rely on the truth or falsity of causal determinism. This view also makes free will close to autonomy, the ability to live according to one's own rules, as opposed to being submitted to external domination.

Alternatives as imaginary 

Some compatibilists hold both causal determinism (all effects have causes) and logical determinism (the future is already determined) to be true. Thus statements about the future (e.g., "it will rain tomorrow") are either true or false when spoken today. This compatibilist free will should not be understood as the ability to choose differently in an identical situation. A compatibilist may believe that a person can decide between several choices, but the choice is always determined by external factors. If the compatibilist says "I may visit tomorrow, or I may not", he is saying that he does not know what he will choose—whether he will choose to follow the subconscious urge to go or not.

Non-naturalism 

Alternatives to strictly naturalist physics, such as mind–body dualism positing a mind or soul existing apart from one's body while perceiving, thinking, choosing freely, and as a result acting independently on the body, include both traditional religious metaphysics and less common newer compatibilist concepts. Also consistent with both autonomy and Darwinism, they allow for free personal agency based on practical reasons within the laws of physics. While less popular among 21st-century philosophers, non-naturalist compatibilism is present in most if not almost all religions.

Criticism 
 
A prominent criticism of compatibilism is Peter van Inwagen's consequence argument.

Critics of compatibilism often focus on the definitions of free will: incompatibilists may agree that the compatibilists are showing something to be compatible with determinism, but they think that this something ought not to be called "free will". Incompatibilists might accept the "freedom to act" as a necessary criterion for free will, but doubt that it is sufficient. The incompatibilists believe that free will refers to genuine (i.e., absolute, ultimate, physical) alternate possibilities for beliefs, desires, or actions, rather than merely counterfactual ones.

Compatibilism is sometimes called soft determinism (William James's term) pejoratively. James accused them of creating a "quagmire of evasion" by stealing the name of freedom to mask their underlying determinism. Immanuel Kant called it a "wretched subterfuge" and "word jugglery". Kant's argument turns on the view that, while all empirical phenomena must result from determining causes, human thought introduces something seemingly not found elsewhere in nature—the ability to conceive of the world in terms of how it ought to be, or how it might otherwise be. For Kant, subjective reasoning is necessarily distinct from how the world is empirically. Because of its capacity to distinguish is from ought, reasoning can "spontaneously" originate new events without being itself determined by what already exists. It is on this basis that Kant argues against a version of compatibilism in which, for instance, the actions of the criminal are comprehended as a blend of determining forces and free choice, which Kant regards as misusing the word free. Kant proposes that taking the compatibilist view involves denying the distinctly subjective capacity to re-think an intended course of action in terms of what ought to happen.

See also
Ash'ari
Libertarianism (metaphysics)
Semicompatibilism

References

External links
Stanford Encyclopedia of Philosophy entry on Compatibilism

Determinism
Free will
Metaphysical theories